Kevin Anderson was the defending champion, but lost in the second round to Jiří Veselý.

Pablo Carreño Busta won his maiden ATP title, defeating Roberto Bautista Agut in the final, 6–7(6–8), 7–6(7–1), 6–4.

Seeds
All seeds receive a bye into the second round.

Draw

Finals

Top half

Section 1

Section 2

Bottom half

Section 3

Section 4

Qualifying

Seeds

Qualifiers

Lucky losers

Qualifying draw

First qualifier

Second qualifier

Third qualifier

Fourth qualifier

References
Main Draw
Qualifying Draw

Winston-Salem Open - Singles
2016 Singles